The Iksa is a river in Novosibirsk Oblast and Tomsk Oblast, Russia.

The basin of the river is located in the Chainsky, Bakcharsky and Kolyvansky districts. There are a number of rural settlements near its banks, such as Plotnikovo, Borodinsk, Kopanoye Ozero, Vostochnoye and Ermilovka. A stretch of its lower course is navigable.

Course 

The Iksa has its sources in the Vasyugan Plain, part of the West Siberian Plain. It flows in an eastern direction in its upper reaches and then in a roughly northern direction all along its middle and lower course. Finally it meets the right bank of the Chaya near Podgornoye,  from its mouth in the Ob.

Tributaries  
There are numerous small lakes and swamps in its basin, especially to the west of its middle course. The river is fed by snow and rain. It is frozen between October and April.

See also
List of rivers of Russia

References 

Rivers of Novosibirsk Oblast
Rivers of Tomsk Oblast
Tributaries of the Chaya